William Maddocks may refer to:

 William Madocks (1773–1828), English Member of Parliament
 Bill Maddocks (1921–1992), English trade union leader